The following is a list of Samoa women's national rugby union team matches.

Overall
Summary of all full international matches (updated to 2020-11-14):

2000s
Samoa played in both Rugby World Cups held in this decade.

2010s
After competing at Rugby World Cup in 2014, Samoa joined the Oceania Championship in 2018.

2020s

References

Women's rugby union matches
Rugby union in Samoa
Women's sport-related lists